Soldiers Under Command is the second release, and first full-length studio album from Christian metal band Stryper, released on May 15, 1985. It was the first Christian metal album to achieve Gold record status, selling more than half a million copies. The album was originally issued on white vinyl. The Live in Japan in-concert video, released in 1986, was filmed on July 8, 1985 during Stryper's tour in support of this album.

A music video of the title track was released.

The inspirational verse for this album is 2 Timothy 2:3-4.

Track listing
All songs written by Michael Sweet, except where noted.
 "Soldiers Under Command" (Michael Sweet, Robert Sweet) – 5:03
 "Makes Me Wanna Sing" – 2:51
 "Together Forever"  – 4:03
 "First Love"  – 5:43
 "The Rock That Makes Me Roll"  – 4:56
 "Reach Out" (M. Sweet, R. Sweet) – 5:21
 "(Waiting for) A Love That's Real"  – 4:36
 "Together as One" – 5:01
 "Surrender" – 4:28
 "Battle Hymn of the Republic" (Julia Ward Howe) – 2:36

Personnel 
Stryper
 Michael Sweet – lead vocals, backing vocals, lead and rhythm guitars, lead guitar solo (4-7)
 Oz Fox – lead and rhythm guitars, lead guitar solo (2-6, 9), backing vocals
 Tim Gaines – keyboards (1-7, 9, 10), bass (1-7, 9, 10), backing vocals (8)
 Robert Sweet – drums

Additional musicians
 John Van Tongeren – keyboards (8), acoustic piano (8), bass (8)
 Christopher Currell – Synclavier programming (10)
 Doris Castenada – backing vocals (10)
 Linda Mullen – backing vocals (10)
 Tammy Thomas – backing vocals (10)

Production 
 Michael Wagener – producer, engineer, mixing 
 Bryan Ayuso – album design 
 John Scarpati – photography 
 Anne Revenge – additional photography

Charts

Certifications

References

1985 debut albums
Stryper albums
Albums produced by Michael Wagener